Kudumba Vishesham is a 1994 Indian Malayalam film, directed by P. Anil, Babu Narayanan, starring Thilakan and Kaviyoor Ponnamma in the lead roles. This movie is  the remake of Tamil movie  Veedu Manaivi Makkal.

Cast
 Thilakan as Madhavan Nair
 Kaviyoor Ponnamma as Bharathi Madhavan Nair
 Maniyanpilla Raju as Prasad M. Nair
 Renuka as Urmila M. Nair (Urmila Uthamman)
 Urvasi as Geetha	M. Nair
 Baiju as Santhosh M. Nair
 Shanthi Krishna as Aswathy Prasad
 Jagadish as Chinna Thampy	(Geetha's love interest)
 Ashokan as  Uthaman
 Seetha as Deepa Santhosh (Daughter of KRC)
 Kalpana as Elikutty
 Rajan P. Dev as KRC
 Meena as Kikkili Kochamma
 Paravoor Bharathanas Kikkili Kochamma's Husband
 Jose Pallissery as Kunjappan
 Kaduvakulam Antony
 M. S. Thripunithura as Aswathy's Father
 Harisree Ashokan as Abubacker
 Usha as Vidhya (Prasad's love interest)
 J. Pallassery as Doctor

Soundtrack

The music was done by Johnson and the lyrics were by Bichu Thirumala.

References

External links

1994 films
1990s Malayalam-language films
Indian drama films
Malayalam remakes of Tamil films
Films directed by Babu Narayanan